Extreme Football League can mean:

X League (women's football), a women's football league in the United States
 XFL (2001), a professional American football league in the United States that played for one season in 2001
 XFL (2020), the second incarnation of the league that began play in 2020

See also
 XFL (disambiguation)
 X League (disambiguation)